Flemming Solberg (born 20 August 1973) is a Norwegian gymnast. He competed at the 1996 Summer Olympics and the 2000 Summer Olympics.

References

1973 births
Living people
Norwegian male artistic gymnasts
Olympic gymnasts of Norway
Gymnasts at the 1996 Summer Olympics
Gymnasts at the 2000 Summer Olympics
Sportspeople from Drammen
20th-century Norwegian people